Birthana taiwana is a moth in the family Immidae. It was described by John B. Heppner in 1990. It is found in Taiwan.

References

Moths described in 1990
Immidae
Moths of Asia